Tepuihyla rodriguezi, also known as the Rodriguez's Amazon treefrog is a species of frog in the family Hylidae found in southeastern Venezuela and Guyana.

Tepuihyla galani, assessed as "near threatened" by the International Union for Conservation of Nature.</ref> is now considered a junior synonym of Tepuihyla rodriguezi.

References

Tepuihyla
Amphibians of Guyana
Amphibians of Venezuela
Amphibians described in 1968
Taxa named by Juan A. Rivero
Taxonomy articles created by Polbot